Ali Ngon Gerba (born September 4, 1981) is a former professional soccer player who played as a forward. Born in Cameroon, he represented the Canada national team.

Club career

Canada and United States
In 2000 Gerba signed with the Montreal Impact, then of the  A-League, where he recorded six goals and two assists, a club record for a rookie. In 2001 Gerba attempted a move up to Major League Soccer by signing with the Miami Fusion, but without success. In 2002 Gerba returned to the A-League when he signed with the Pittsburgh Riverhounds. Late in the season he was traded to the Toronto Lynx. In 2003, Gerba was the leading scorer for the Lynx with six goals when he was traded to the Impact late in the season. Gerba returned to the Lynx in 2004. During an outstanding season, he scored 15 goals, a club record. Gerba started for the Lynx in 2005, scoring two goals, before returning to the Impact in exchange for Abraham Francois and Sita-Taty Matondo. Gerba left the Lynx as the club's second highest all-time scorer with 24 goals in total. With the Impact Gerba played an important role in helping the team stay undefeated in 15 games, a league record. As a result, Gerba was capped  by Canada in the Gold Cup where he played three games and scored one goal.

Europe
After the Gold Cup Gerba joined Swedish club GIF Sundsvall of the Allsvenskan and scored 6 goals in 11 games. When the team was relegated to the Superettan, Gerba moved to Swedish club IFK Gothenburg on a three-year deal. In 2006, he was loaned to Odd Grenland in Norway, and in 2007 he went on loan again to Danish Superliga side AC Horsens before joining German club FC Ingolstadt 04 in January 2008. In June 2008, he was released from his contract with the club.

As of June 28, 2008, Gerba was being linked with a return to North America to join Canadian manager Frank Yallop at Major League Soccer club San Jose Earthquakes. However, on August 7, 2008, he signed for Football League One newcomers Milton Keynes Dons. On August 20, 2008, he made his first appearance for the Dons in a 3–0 away victory against Colchester United and scored his first goal in his second game, a 2–1 defeat to Peterborough United. The club announced they would not be offering Gerba a new contract for the 2009–10 season.

Return to Canada
Gerba was linked with moves to MLS with Toronto FC, a return to his hometown Montreal Impact and also with English sides, Millwall, Stockport County, Oldham Athletic, Brentford and Burton Albion. Toronto FC announced the signing of Gerba on its website on June 23, 2009.
Gerba made his unofficial debut for Toronto FC in an international friendly against the Argentinean powerhouse Club Atlético River Plate, at BMO Field on July 22, 2009. Gerba scored on his MLS debut vs. Columbus Crew on July 25, 2009, in a 3–2 loss.

On July 15, 2010. Gerba joined the Montreal Impact for his 4th stint with the team during which he set the club record for fastest goal in club history (18 seconds into the game) and scored the club's first regular season hat-trick.

At the end of the 2011 NASL season, head coach Jesse Marsch and sporting director Nick De Santis evaluated the Impact squad in preparation for the team's move to Major League Soccer, and Gerba was cut on October 12, 2011.

International career 
Gerba made his debut for Canada in a July 2005 friendly match against Honduras. By December 2009, he had the country's most prolific strike-rate, with 15 goals in 28 full internationals.

Gerba has represented Canada in three CONCACAF Gold Cups and 2010 FIFA World Cup qualification. He is the all-time leader in goals for Canada at the Gold Cup with six.

Career statistics

Club

International
Scores and results list Canada's goal tally first, score column indicates score after each Gerba goal.

Honours
Individual
 USSF D-2 Pro League Best XI: 2010

References

External links
 
 
 
 
 
 

  

1982 births
Living people
Footballers from Yaoundé
Cameroonian emigrants to Canada
Naturalized citizens of Canada
Soccer players from Montreal
Francophone Quebec people
Black Canadian soccer players
Association football forwards
Canadian soccer players
Canada men's international soccer players
2005 CONCACAF Gold Cup players
2007 CONCACAF Gold Cup players
2009 CONCACAF Gold Cup players
2011 CONCACAF Gold Cup players
Canadian expatriate soccer players
Canadian expatriate sportspeople in the United States
Canadian expatriate sportspeople in Sweden
Canadian expatriate sportspeople in Norway
Canadian expatriate sportspeople in Denmark
Canadian expatriate sportspeople in Germany
Major League Soccer players
Miami Fusion players
Montreal Impact (1992–2011) players
Pittsburgh Riverhounds SC players
Toronto Lynx players
GIF Sundsvall players
IFK Göteborg players
Odds BK players
AC Horsens players
FC Ingolstadt 04 players
Milton Keynes Dons F.C. players
Toronto FC players
USL First Division players
USL Second Division players
USSF Division 2 Professional League players
North American Soccer League players
Allsvenskan players
Eliteserien players
Danish Superliga players
Expatriate soccer players in the United States
Expatriate footballers in Sweden
Expatriate footballers in Norway
Expatriate men's footballers in Denmark
Expatriate footballers in Germany
Expatriate footballers in England
Canadian people of Cameroonian descent
A-League (1995–2004) players
Miami Fusion draft picks
Canadian expatriate sportspeople in England